Monika Brudlewsky (born 4 May 1945) is a German politician of the Christian Democratic Union (CDU) and former member of the German Bundestag.

Life 
After graduating from high school, she attended the medical school from 1964 to 1966. She worked as a nurse in a hospital, a home for the elderly, a facility for the disabled and a doctor's practice (until 1990). In 1973 she joined the CDU of the GDR. In March 1990 she was elected to the Volkskammer, in December 1990 to the German Bundestag, of which she was a member until 2002.

References 

1946 births
Living people
Members of the Bundestag for Saxony-Anhalt
Members of the Bundestag 1998–2002
Members of the Bundestag 1994–1998
Members of the Bundestag 1990–1994
Members of the Bundestag 1987–1990
Female members of the Bundestag
20th-century German women politicians
21st-century German women politicians
Members of the Bundestag for the Christian Democratic Union of Germany
Members of the 10th Volkskammer